The One Club Award is a football award established in 2015 by the Spain-based club Athletic Bilbao to reward footballers whose careers in a single team represent values that the club considers linked to its identity. These values are those of loyalty, commitment, responsibility, sportsmanship and respect. The award is presented at halftime during an Athletic Bilbao home match by club ambassador José Ángel Iribar. 

It is one of the few awards given out by an individual club that celebrates players from other teams. For that reason, the award has been described as rare point of non-tribalism in the modern game. The male award, The One Club Man, has been awarded since 2015, while also awarding a female award, known as One Club Woman, from 2019.

The Award 
The prize exists to honour players who have demonstrated a "real" connection to region of their club. Athletic Bilbao place particular importance on player loyalty and promotion from within, with the majority of their players graduating from their youth academy system based at the Lezama Facilities outside Bilbao; they have a self-imposed limitation where they will only field players that have a connection to the Basque region where they are based. As such they have a small pool of potential players to choose from compared to other large clubs, and their players are encouraged to agree to long-term contracts to remain.

According to the club, up until the 21st century "the association between clubs and the territory they belonged to was a football club’s most important identifying feature". This feature is what they call the Principle of Origin - "which boils down to: I support the team of where I come from because their players represent me and share my origin. They are “our players”. In recent years, the club believes that the principle of origin has been superseded by success at all costs with clubs often featuring teams without any players from the city the club represents.

Values 
Athletic Club define the club's values as:

 Loyalty 
 Towards the club that placed their trust in a young, promising player and developed that player into an elite footballer.
 Commitment
 To fostering a football culture that encourages a mutual sense of belonging among fans and players.
 Responsibility 
 Towards the cultural identity of the club, the place it belongs to and its fans.
 Sportsmanship 
 Ensuring that the sporting spirit of the game always prevails and that the equality between participants is protected.
 Respect 
 For all fans, whose passion is the raw material that enriches football.

Winners

See also 
 List of one-club men in association football

References 

Athletic Bilbao
Spanish football trophies and awards
Awards established in 2015
2015 establishments in Spain
Women's association football trophies and awards